Olsen is a Danish-Norwegian patronymic surname meaning "son of Ole". The surname Olesen has a similar origin. The Swedish parallel form is Olsson – "son of Ola". Danish and Norwegian immigrants to English-speaking countries often changed the spelling to Olson in order to accommodate English orthographic rules.

Notable people with the surname include:

A–K
Aase Olesen (1934–2013), Danish politician
Andrea Olsen (born 1961), American politician
Angel Olsen (born 1987), American singer.
Anton Olsen (U.S. Navy) (1873–1924), Spanish–American War Medal of Honor recipient
Ben Olsen (born 1977), American soccer player
Bjørnar Olsen (born 1958), Norwegian archaeologist 
Brian Olsen (born 1975), American mixed martial artist
Carsten Olsen (1891–1974), Danish plant ecologist and physiologist
Charles Olsen (1910–1970), American poet renowned for his provocative style and large body of works
Dorothy Olsen (1916–2019), American aircraft pilot and member of the Women Airforce Service Pilots (WASPs)
Elizabeth Olsen (born 1989), American actress
Eric Christian Olsen (born 1977), American actor
Eunice Olsen (born 1977), Singaporean actress and model
Frances Olsen (born 1945), American law professor at UCLA, feminist law scholar.
Frederik-Valdemar Olsen (1877–1962), Danish soldier, commander in chief of the Belgian Congo Force Publique
Gary Olsen (1957–2000), English actor
Greg Olsen (disambiguation), multiple people
Gregory Olsen (born 1945), American entrepreneur and scientist, space tourist
Harold Olsen (1895–1953), American college sports coach
Helle Olsen, better known as Helle Helle, Danish writer born 1965
Hilde Gunn Olsen (born 1992), Norwegian footballer
Inger Pors Olsen (born 1966), Danish rower
Jens Olsen (1872–1945), Danish clockmaker and locksmith 
John Olsen (born 1928), Australian artist
John Olsen, 42nd Premier of South Australia
José María Figueres Olsen (born 1954), 42nd President of Costa Rica
Karen Olsen Beck (born 1933), Danish American-Costa Rican diplomat and politician
Ken Olsen (1926–2011), American engineer, co-founder of Digital Equipment Corporation
Kirsten Olesen (born 1949), Danish actress
Kjeld Olesen (born 1932), Danish politician
Kristoffer Olsen (1883–1948), a Norwegian sailor who competed in the 1920 Summer Olympics
Kurt Olsen, American attorney who worked on efforts to overturn 2020 election

L–Z
Larry Olsen (disambiguation), multiple people
Lisa Olsen (born 1956), Canadian skydiver
Maria Olsen, South African film producer
Maria Olsen, New Zealand artist
Martin Olsen (disambiguation), multiple people
Mary-Kate and Ashley Olsen (born 1986), American actress twins
Merlin Olsen, Hall of Fame NFL American football player and TV color commentator
Michael Olsen (disambiguation), multiple people
Moroni Olsen (1889–1954), American actor
Niels Olsen (born 1988), Ecuadorian politician 
Niels Olsen, original name of Cornelius Cruys, 17th century Norwegian-Dutch admiral in Russian service
Norman Eugene Olsen (December 1, 1914 – October 1977) was an American football tackle
Ole Olsen (disambiguation), multiple people
Ollie Olsen (born 1958), Australian-based multi-instrumentalist, composer and sound designer. 
Peder Olsen Walløe (1716–1793), Danish-Norwegian Arctic explorer
Penelope Diane Olsen, Australian ornithologist and author
Peter B. Olsen (1848–1926), American politician
Robin Olsen, (born 1990), Swedish football goalkeeper
Sally Olsen (1912-2006), Norwegian-born American social worker and missionary
Sally Olsen (Minnesota politician) (1934-2022), American lawyer and politician
Scott Olsen (born 1984), American Major League Baseball pitcher for the Florida Marlins
Søren Olesen (1891–1973), Danish teacher and politician
Súni Olsen, a Faroese football player
Susan Olsen (born 1961), American actress best known as Cindy Brady on The Brady Bunch
Tava Olsen, New Zealand professor in supply chain management
Tillie Olsen (1912–2007), American writer, feminist, and political activist
Viktor Olsen (born 1924), Norwegian long-distance runner
Olsen Brothers, Danish rock/pop music duo

Fictional characters with the surname include
Jimmy Olsen, a fictional character who appears in DC Comics' Superman stories
Tulip Olsen, the main character in Book One of the animated anthology series Infinity Train

See also
 Olson (surname)
 Olsson

Danish-language surnames
Norwegian-language surnames
Patronymic surnames
Surnames from given names

de:Olsen
fr:Olsen
hu:Olsen (egyértelműsítő lap)
ru:Олсен
fi:Olsen